A few ships of the British Royal Navy have borne the name HMS Zenobia, named after Zenobia, the Queen of the Palmyrene Empire who conquered Egypt.

 was a 10-gun schooner or cutter launched in 1806 that was wrecked in October twenty miles south of Cape Henry, Virginia. 
 was an 18-gun  launched in 1807 and sold in 1835.
 was built at Waterford as Kilkenny in 1839 and purchased on the stocks for the Indian Navy for use as a paddle sloop; she was hulked in 1850 
 was a steam frigate that the Bombay Dockyard built in 1851 for the Indian Navy 
 was a  launched in 1941 and renamed Snowflake. Sold in 1947 as weather ship Weather Watcher. Scrapped in May 1962 at Dublin.

See also
Zenobia (ship)

Royal Navy ship names